Pyroderces is a genus of cosmet moths (family Cosmopterigidae). It belongs to subfamily Cosmopteriginae. Some authors include Anatrachyntis here.

Species

 Pyroderces aellotricha
 Pyroderces albistrigella (Möschler, 1890) 
 Pyroderces anthinopa 
 Pyroderces apicinotella (Chrétien, 1915) (type species of Lallia)
 Pyroderces apparitella  (Walker, 1864)
 Pyroderces argentata
 Pyroderces argobalana Meyrick, 1915 
 Pyroderces argyrogrammos
 Pyroderces bifurcata Z.W.Zhang & H.H.Li, 2009 
 Pyroderces brosi
 Pyroderces caesaris
 Pyroderces cervinella  
 Pyroderces chalcoptila  
 Pyroderces deamatella (Walker, 1864) (type species of Syntomactis) 
 Pyroderces dimidiella (Snellen, 1885) 
 Pyroderces diplecta  
 Pyroderces eupogon Turner, 1926 
 Pyroderces firma 
 Pyroderces hapalodes Turner, 1923
 Pyroderces jonesella  
 Pyroderces klimeschi
 Pyroderces leptarga  
 Pyroderces longalitella 
 Pyroderces melanosarca 
 Pyroderces narcota
 Pyroderces nephelopyrrha  
 Pyroderces ocreella 
 Pyroderces orientella Sinev, 1993
 Pyroderces sarcogypsa
 Pyroderces sphenosema   
 Pyroderces spix Bippus, 2020
 Pyroderces syngalactis  
 Pyroderces tenuilinea Turner, 1923  
 Pyroderces tersectella  
 Pyroderces tethysella
 Pyroderces urantha 
 Pyroderces wolschrijni
 Pyroderces phaeostigma 
 Pyroderces pogonias Turner, 1923

References
Natural History Museum Lepidoptera genus database

 
Cosmopteriginae
Moth genera